The 1950 NBA World Championship Series was the championship round of the National Basketball Association (NBA)'s inaugural 1949–50 season. The Central Division champion Minneapolis Lakers faced the Eastern Division champion Syracuse Nationals in a best-of-seven series with Syracuse having home-court advantage.

The NBA recognizes three preceding Basketball Association of America (BAA) seasons as part of its own history, and thus presents the 1950 Finals as its fourth championship series. Minneapolis had won the 1949 BAA Finals and its 1950 win over Syracuse is officially the Lakers second of five titles in Minneapolis.

In the event, six games were played in 16 days, beginning Saturday and Sunday, April 8 and 9, in Syracuse and incorporating two subsequent Sunday games in Minneapolis. Counting a Central Division tiebreaker played on Monday, March 20, the entire postseason tournament spanned five full weeks to Sunday, April 23.

The NBA was arranged in three divisions (for its first season only) and the first two rounds of the 1950 NBA Playoffs generated three Division champions. With the league's best regular season record, Syracuse had earned a place in the Finals by winning the Eastern Division title on the preceding Sunday, and had been five days idle while the Central and Western champions had played a best-of-three series mid-week.

In Game 1, The Lakers won on a buzzer beating shot by sub Bob "Tiger" Harrison, the first known case of a buzzer beater in the Finals. 6'8" Dolph Schayes of Syracuse led his team out to the finals after a 16.8 ppg average during the regular season. George Mikan, however, averaged 27.4 ppg and led the league. Mikan would lead the Lakers past Syracuse in six games.

Series summary

Lakers win series 4−2

Rosters

References

External links
 1950 Finals at NBA.com
 1950 NBA Playoffs at Basketball-Reference.com

National Basketball Association Finals
Finals
NBA
NBA
NBA Finals
NBA Finals
1950s in Minneapolis
NBA Finals
History of Onondaga County, New York
Basketball competitions in Minneapolis
Basketball competitions in Syracuse, New York